The Human League are an English synth-pop band formed in Sheffield in 1977. Initially an experimental electronic outfit, the group signed to Virgin Records in 1979 and later attained widespread commercial success with their third album Dare in 1981 after restructuring their lineup. The album contained four hit singles, including the UK/US number one hit "Don't You Want Me". The band received the Brit Award for Best British Breakthrough Act in 1982. Further hits followed throughout the 1980s and into the 1990s, including "Mirror Man", "(Keep Feeling) Fascination", "The Lebanon", "Human" (a second US No. 1) and "Tell Me When".

The only constant band member since 1977 has been lead singer and songwriter Philip Oakey. Keyboard players Martyn Ware and Ian Craig Marsh both left the band in 1980 to form Heaven 17. Under Oakey's leadership, the Human League then evolved into a commercially successful new pop band, with a new line-up including female vocalists Joanne Catherall and Susan Ann Sulley. Since the mid-1990s, the band have essentially been a trio of Oakey, Catherall and Sulley with various sidemen.

Since 1978, the Human League have released 9 studio albums, a remix album, a live album, 6 EPs, 29 singles and 13 compilation albums. They have had 6 Top 20 albums and 13 Top 20 singles in the UK and had sold more than 20 million records worldwide by 2010. As an early techno-pop act that received extensive MTV airplay, they are regarded as one of the leading artists of the 1980s Second British Invasion of the US.

History

1970s: Early years
Before adopting the name the Human League, the band briefly had two previous incarnations. In early 1977, Martyn Ware and Ian Craig Marsh, who had met at youth arts project Meatwhistle, were both working as computer operators. Their musical collaboration combined pop music (such as glam rock and Tamla Motown) with avant-garde electronic music. With the price of electronic components dropping in the mid-1970s, equipment became more affordable for the average consumer; Ware and Marsh purchased a Korg 700S synthesizer together and learned how to play it. Their musical reputation spread, and they were invited to play at a friend's 21st birthday party. For the party, Ware and Marsh formed themselves into an informal band called The Dead Daughters. Their live highlight was a rendition of the theme of the British TV series Doctor Who.

After a few more low-key, private performances, Ware and Marsh decided to officially form a band. Joined by their friend Adi Newton and another synthesizer (a Roland System-100), they formed The Future and began to create music in their own rehearsal facility in a disused cutlery workshop in the centre of Sheffield. Although The Future was never signed and did not release material commercially at the time, a collection of demos from this period was released retrospectively on CD in 2002 titled The Golden Hour of the Future, mixed by Richard X. The association with Adi Newton was short; Newton left The Future and went on to form Clock DVA. Ware at this point decided that he needed a singer rather than another keyboard player. The reason for this was twofold: record companies had been reluctant to sign The Future, as they could not offer any "marketable" songs, and therefore a talented singer was required for any chance of commercial success; also the group only owned two synthesizers and could not afford a third.

Ware and Marsh searched for a vocalist, but their first choice, Glenn Gregory, was unavailable (Gregory eventually became the lead singer of their subsequent band Heaven 17). Ware then decided to invite an old school friend, Philip Oakey, to join the band. Oakey was working as a hospital porter at the time and was known on the Sheffield social scene for his eclectic style of dress. Although he had no musical experience, Ware thought he would be ideal as lead singer for The Future as "he already looked like a pop star". When Ware called on Oakey, he found he was out, so asked him to join the Future by leaving a note stuck to his front door. He accepted the invitation, but early sessions were awkward. Oakey had never sung in front of an audience before, could not play keyboards and only owned a saxophone (which he could barely play). Listening to one of Ware and Marsh's demos, Oakey was inspired to write some lyrics which later became the single "Being Boiled".

With a new line-up, sound, and vocalist, Ware decided that the band needed a new name. It would also allow them to approach record companies again from a different angle. Ware suggested "The Human League", after a group in the science-fiction board game StarForce: Alpha Centauri. In the game, the Human League arose in 2415 A.D. and were a frontier-oriented society that desired more independence from Earth. Oakey and Marsh agreed on the new name, and in early 1978 The Future became The Human League.

Using Future material, the Human League released a demo tape to record companies under their new name. The tape contained versions of "Being Boiled", "Toyota City" and "Circus of Death". Ware's friend Paul Bower of Sheffield new-wave band "2.3", who had just recorded a single for Bob Last's Edinburgh-based independent label Fast Product, took their demo to Last and he signed the band.

The band released their first single, "Being Boiled", in June 1978, which became Fast Product's third release. Although a limited release—because it was unique and at odds with everything else on the market—it was picked up on by NME, who championed the band, although one guest reviewer, John Lydon of Public Image Limited, condemned the band as "trendy hippies".

Boosted by critical praise, on 12 June 1978 the band played their first live gig together at Bar 2 in Sheffield's Psalter Lane Art College (latterly Sheffield Hallam University); a plaque commemorated the event until the Psalter Lane site officially closed on 31 August 2008.

With their reliance on technology and tape machines, the band had been nervous about playing live. After the Psalter Lane performance, they worried that they had appeared static and uninspiring. A friend of Oakey's who had been in the audience, Philip Adrian Wright, who also had an art and photography background, was invited to become the band's Director of Visuals, with a remit to "liven up" the stage performance with slides, film clips and lighting.

In August 1978 the band recorded a session for John Peel, including a re-worked version of "Being Boiled."

The band's live performances began to gain momentum and acclaim, and they were asked to support first The Rezillos (featuring future band member Jo Callis), then Siouxsie and the Banshees, as early as September 1978. In December 1978, David Bowie appeared in the audience and later declared to NME that he "had seen the future of pop music".

In April 1979, the Human League released their first EP on the Fast Product label entitled The Dignity of Labour, which contained four experimental instrumentals. Although the EP barely charted, major record labels began approaching the band in an attempt to lure them away from Fast. In May 1979, the band accepted an offer by Richard Branson's Virgin Records. Because of his label's early support, the band offered Bob Last the position as band manager.

In June 1979, the Human League supported Iggy Pop on his European tour, before settling into recording their first single for Virgin. Despite promising them creative freedom, Virgin demanded sweeping changes to the band's style for their first single, in order to make it more commercial. The label required the band to use conventional instruments and vocals as well as synthesizers. Because the League had accepted a large financial signing advance, Ware was in no position to refuse but insisted that any releases in this style be credited to a pseudonym.

The band's first single under Virgin Records was the disco influenced "I Don't Depend on You", released in July 1979 under the pseudonym "The Men". The single did not chart and had very little in common with the previous work of the Human League. It did, however, feature female vocals by guests Lisa (Liza) Strike and Katie Kissoon, sounding like the yet-to-be-formed future Human League of 1981.

Because the imposed style had not worked, Virgin permitted the band to return to their original style and the band recorded and released their first full studio album Reproduction in August 1979. The album and the single "Empire State Human" failed to make an impact on the charts. After these flops, Virgin cancelled the band's December 1979 tour. By this time, the Human League's role as UK electronic pioneers was usurped by Gary Numan, when his single "Are 'Friends' Electric?" became a huge hit in the UK in mid-1979.

In March 1980, the band—which had not yet hit the singles charts—was namechecked in a UK hit song by The Undertones. The track "My Perfect Cousin", which would peak at #9 on the UK charts in May, contained a dig at the perceived "arty" Human League in the lyric:

"His mother bought him a synthesiser / Got the Human League in to advise her / Now he's making lots of noise / Playing along with the art school boys"

In April 1980, the band was able to release an EP entitled Holiday '80, containing the principal track "Marianne" and a cover of "Nightclubbing" (written by Bowie and Iggy Pop). The seven-inch version of "Holiday '80" did well enough to get the band their first TV appearance on BBC TV's Top of the Pops on 8 May 1980 opening a Peter Powell presented show with Gary Glitter's "Rock and Roll Part 2". This was to be the only high-profile TV appearance by the Oakey/Marsh/Ware trio on British television, with the sole exception of BBC2's Mainstream programme in late 1979, organised and presented by the artist Brian Clarke, an early supporter of the band. A performance in the studio, complete with slideshow, was broadcast of the tracks "The Path of Least Resistance" and the current minor hit "Empire State Human".

In May 1980, the band toured the UK. Philip Adrian Wright was now playing incidental keyboards in addition to his visuals role. It was the last time all four members performed together live. Also in May, the band released their second studio album Travelogue. More commercial-sounding than Reproduction, it peaked at No. 16 in the UK, giving the band their first real success. As a result, "Empire State Human" was re-released and the band made their second appearance on Top of the Pops, even though it only reached No. 62 in the singles chart.

Because of their lack of commercial success, Virgin refused to release further singles from Travelogue. The Human League was booked to conduct a tour of the UK and Europe from October to November 1980, but the lack of success after two years of hard work and perceived lack of faith by Virgin set about severe internal conflict within the band.

Equipment used in this period were: Roland Jupiter 4, Korg 770, Roland System 100 consisting of 1 × 101 keyboard, 2 × 102 expanders, 2 × 104 sequencers and 103 mixer, plus taped backing for rhythm and drum parts.

1980s: Line up changes and rise in popularity
 The relationship between Oakey and Ware had always been turbulent, and the pair often quarrelled over creative and personal matters. Their lack of success compared with the success of Gary Numan at that time had brought matters to a head. Ware insisted the band maintain their pure electronic sound, while Oakey wanted to emulate the more conventional sound of more successful pop groups. The two clashed continually and Ware eventually walked out in 1980. Taking Ware's side, Ian Craig Marsh joined him in exiting The Human League.

Manager Bob Last tried to reconcile both parties, and when that proved impossible, various options were suggested, including two new bands under a Human League sub-label. Eventually, it was agreed that Oakey would continue with the Human League name, while Ware and Marsh would form a completely new band, which became Heaven 17. Two weeks before the UK/Europe tour, the band split.

Retaining the Human League name came at a heavy price for Oakey. As the band's sole remaining member, he was responsible for all Human League debts and commitments. Furthermore, the terms of the Virgin contract required him to pay Ware and Marsh one per cent of royalties of the next Human League album. The split also jeopardized the band's upcoming tour. With the first performance only ten days away and the music media reporting that the Human League was finished now that "the talented people had left", promoters started threatening to sue Oakey if the concerts was not completed as contracted. 

To save the tour, Oakey had to recruit new people in a matter of days. He initially intended to hire a single female backing vocalist to replace Ware, who provided high-pitched backing vocals. In a frequently repeated anecdote, Oakey and his then girlfriend went into Sheffield city centre one Wednesday night and visited various venues with the hope of finding a female singer to join the band. They eventually came to the Crazy Daisy Nightclub on High Street, where Oakey spotted two girls dancing together on the dance floor, Susan Ann Sulley and Joanne Catherall. They were both 17-year-old students on a night out and neither had any experience singing or dancing professionally. With no preamble, Oakey asked both girls to join the tour as dancers and incidental vocalists.

Oakey has stated that upon discovering the girls were only teenagers and also best friends, he invited them both so they could look after each other on the tour for safety. He has also said that he thought having two women as vocalists and dancers would also add glamour to the band. Because of the girls' ages, Oakey and Wright later had to visit Sulley and Catherall's respective parents to obtain permission for the girls to go on the tour. Their parents let them join the band under the provision that Oakey would keep them safe. Sulley also reported that both her father and Catherall's went to the girls' school and convince them that the experience of touring could be highly educational because of the travelling involved.

In addition to Sulley and Catherall, Oakey employed professional musician Ian Burden from Sheffield synth band Graph as a session keyboard player for the tour to cover for the keyboards of the now departed Ware and Marsh.

The tour was completed as advertised with the first date at Doncaster Top Rank but was less than successful. The music press was scornful of "Oakey and his dancing girls" and treated the new band line-up with derision. Many of the audiences who had paid to see the original all-male line-up were not happy with the new band; Sulley and Catherall were often heckled and, on occasion, objects were thrown.

On completion of the tour, Burden went on to his next commitment playing bass guitar in West Berlin. Because of the professionalism they had shown and because he planned to use them further vocally, Oakey and manager Bob Last made Sulley and Catherall full members of the band, to be paid on a salary basis.

In January 1981, although they had survived the tour, the band was still in trouble. Heavily in debt to Virgin Records, Oakey and Wright were under pressure to produce results quickly. By February 1981 the band recorded and rushed out "Boys and Girls". Sulley and Catherall (who had returned to their sixth-form full-time) were not involved in the recording but were included on the single's front cover. The single reached No. 47 in the UK charts, the band's highest chart position to that point. Oakey acknowledged that he needed to bring in professional musicians, and so Ian Burden was tracked down and invited to join the band as a trial member.

Virgin's faith had been restored by "Boys and Girls", but they believed the band lacked professional production. In March, Oakey was introduced to veteran producer Martin Rushent. Rushent's first move was to dispatch the entire band to his Genetic Studios in Reading, Berkshire, away from the "unhealthy atmosphere" of Monumental Studios, Sheffield, that they shared with Ware and Marsh's Heaven 17. The first result of the Genetic sessions was the single "The Sound of the Crowd". The single became their first Top 40 hit, reaching No. 12 in the UK.

Bob Last believed that the band could be improved further by the addition of one more professional musician, so in April 1981, his associate Jo Callis (formerly of The Rezillos whom Last had previously managed) was invited to become the final permanent member of the band. The next single, "Love Action (I Believe in Love)", reached No. 3 in the UK in August 1981. The band set about arranging their existing material and demos into a viable album, produced by Rushent. Sulley and Catherall, who had just left school, immediately postponed their plans to attend university to work on the album.

By this time, the band's commercial success and higher profile had caused their first two albums to start selling again. Reproduction charted for the first time in August 1981, eventually peaking at No. 34, and Travelogue also recharted and returned to the Top 30 for several weeks. Both albums would eventually achieve Gold status. In October 1981, Virgin released a brand new single, "Open Your Heart", which gave the band another Top 10 hit. The band's new album, Dare, was also released in October 1981 and reached No. 1 in the UK. It spent a total of four weeks at the top spot over the 1981/82 period, remaining in the chart for 77 weeks and eventually going triple platinum.

Because of Dare success, Virgin executive Simon Draper instructed that a fourth single be released from the album before the end of 1981. His choice was to be "Don't You Want Me", a track Oakey considered to be a filler and the weakest track on the album. Oakey fought the decision, believing it would damage the band, but was overruled by Draper, and "Don't You Want Me" was released in November 1981. Aided by an expensive music video (a rarity at the time) directed by film maker Steve Barron, the single went to No. 1 for five weeks over the 1981 Christmas period. In a 1995 interview with music journalist James Richliano, Oakey credited MTV for helping the song reach the top of the charts: "I don't think we would have had a number one if it weren't for the video and MTV. Trying to interpret songs with video is a real problem, but at the same time, we know that we wouldn't be here without video."

"Don't You Want Me" became the band's biggest hit, selling almost 1.5 million copies in the UK. Dare has since been labelled as one of pop music's most influential albums. In a retrospective review of the album, Stephen Thomas Erlewine, senior editor for AllMusic, gave Dare a five-star rating. He wrote: "The technology may have dated, synths and drum machines may have become more advanced, but few have manipulated technology in such an emotionally effective way." Philip Oakey often plays down claims of "Dare" being such an influential album, but at other times acknowledges its influence on modern music. In 2001, paraphrasing an NME headline from 1980, Oakey once famously quipped: "The Human League: one day all music will be made like this! And it is!"

Although the group has been retrospectively identified with the New Romantic movement of this period, according to Dave Rimmer, author of New Romantics: The Look, "at the time [they] were no such thing." The band themselves have also consistently and strenuously rejected the label. The Sheffield scene in which the Human League formed predated New Romanticism and took more influence from Kraftwerk. Bands in the Sheffield scene were also referred to as Futurists, although Oakey himself has said: "We thought we were the punkiest band in Sheffield."

Capitalising on the success of the album and their recent No. 1 hit single, "Being Boiled" was re-released and became a Top 10 hit in early 1982. The band toured for the first time together internationally. Concurrently, Dare (later renamed Dare!) was released in the US by A&M Records and "Don't You Want Me" also reached No. 1 there in the summer of 1982. A remix album of Dare entitled Love and Dancing was released under the group name "The League Unlimited Orchestra" (a tribute to Barry White's Love Unlimited Orchestra), reaching No. 3 on the UK album chart.

In 1982, the band received the Best British Newcomer award at the annual Brit Music awards, and Rushent also took Best Producer for his work on Dare. By the end of the awards party, a drunken Sulley and Catherall had lost the band's valuable trophy and it was never seen again.

In November 1982, the Motown influenced electropop single "Mirror Man" reached No. 2 in the UK chart, just missing another Christmas No. 1, which was taken by a novelty record by Renée and Renato.

The Human League's work was now recognised on both sides of the Atlantic. In February 1983, the band was nominated for the Best New Artist award at the 25th Annual Grammy Awards (though the award eventually went to Men at Work).

The follow-up single, "(Keep Feeling) Fascination", was released in April 1983, and peaked at No. 2 in the UK. The following months proved to be difficult ones for the band as they struggled to record a follow-up album to Dare under immense pressure from Virgin. A six-song EP called Fascination! composed of the singles "Mirror Man" and "Fascination" together with the new track "I Love You Too Much" was released from the original recording sessions for their new album, later to be named Hysteria. The EP was released in America as a stop-gap and also became a strong seller as an import in the UK.

In August 1983, the band released "the UK's first videotape single" to capitalise on the growing market created by the increasing popularity of domestic home video cassette recorders (VCRs), called The Human League Video Single. Although "video albums" had been released by bands such as Blondie and ELO as early as 1979, this release was a short (12 mins) video tape cassette in either VHS or Betamax format containing just three tracks (the music videos for "Mirror Man", "Love Action (I Believe in Love)", and "Don't You Want Me"). Although it was not a commercial success (as it retailed for £10.99, compared to 12" vinyl singles averaging £1.99 in 1983), the format caught on and other artists began releasing video singles/EPs of their own.

The band spent many months agonising as they tried to make a successor to Dare, and as things became ever more stressful, producer Martin Rushent left the project. At this point, the band ditched much of the material recorded so far and started over again with new producers Hugh Padgham and Chris Thomas (though some of Rushent's contributions to certain tracks from the earlier sessions were included on the released album).

Finally in May 1984, the band released the politically charged single "The Lebanon" about the Lebanese Civil War. The single peaked at No. 11 in the UK. This was followed shortly thereafter by the album Hysteria, so called because of the difficult and tense recording process. It entered the UK album chart at No. 3; however, it climbed no further and critics and fans were divided by the new direction the band had taken. The second single was "Life on Your Own" in mid-1984. The single peaked at No. 16.

Later that year, success outside of the Human League came for Oakey in the shape of the huge hit single "Together in Electric Dreams", a collaboration with one of his idols, synth pioneer Giorgio Moroder. The track was taken from the film soundtrack to Electric Dreams and became a massive hit. Often now erroneously credited as a Human League single, due to its success and enduring popularity, the band have since adopted it for their live performances and it appears on their greatest hits compilations. Oakey and Moroder then recorded an album together for Virgin, Philip Oakey & Giorgio Moroder, but this met with rather less success and the following two singles failed to make the UK Top 40. However, the success of the original Oakey and Moroder track encouraged Virgin to release one final single from Hysteria in November 1984; the ballad "Louise" was released and reached No. 13 in the UK.

After Hysteria, the group found themselves in creative stagnation, struggling to record material to follow up on their previous successes. Key songwriter Jo Callis departed, replaced by drummer Jim Russell. Bob Last quit as manager and was not replaced. In 1985, the band spent several months working on a new album with producer Colin Thurston (who had produced the first two Duran Duran albums), but yet more clashes in the recording studio ensued and the project was shelved in September 1985.

Worried by the lack of progress with their most profitable act, Virgin paired the Human League up with American R&B producers Jimmy Jam and Terry Lewis, who had a proven track record with Janet Jackson, the SOS Band, Alexander O'Neal, and Cherelle. Jam and Lewis had expressed an interest in working with the band after hearing their US releases. Virgin flew the entire band to Minneapolis. The four-month-long recording sessions were beset with creative disputes, with Jam and Lewis having preconceived ideas on how they wanted the album to sound, rejecting most of the band's material (which would cost the band considerable loss of royalty income). The band eventually quit the sessions early amidst creative acrimony, although the personal relationships had actually been good.

The final result of the sessions was the Crash album. The album featured much material written by the Jam and Lewis team, and showcased their Yamaha DX7-led sound. It had a US No. 1 single, "Human" (No. 8 in the UK), but other singles performed relatively poorly. The album, while making the Top 10 in the UK, was not as popular as previous releases. Disheartened by being sidelined in Minneapolis and with the direction the band had taken, Adrian Wright left the band to work in film. Crash was generally more popular in the US and internationally than in the UK. The band toured in the UK and internationally in 1986 and 1987 to capitalise on their high profile at this time.

In 1987, Ian Burden also left the band. In November 1988, a greatest hits compilation album was released that reached No. 3 in UK. This was preceded by the release of the single "Love Is All That Matters" from Crash.

In 1989, the band built their own studio in Sheffield, jointly funded by Oakey and a business development loan from Sheffield City Council. Oakey believed that if the band owned their own facilities it would cut down on the production costs of future albums, and the band could become more productive.

1990s: Further recordings
In 1990, the band released their last album for Virgin Records, Romantic?. By now, longstanding members Adrian Wright and Ian Burden, together with newer recruit Jim Russell, had all left the band, although Jo Callis did return to play on some of the sessions and co-wrote two songs, including the minor hit single "Heart Like a Wheel". New to the line-up were keyboardist Neil Sutton, who had worked with the band on the Crash tour of 1986, and guitarist/keyboardist Russell Dennett. At odds with the prevailing trend of US grunge and the Manchester scene, the Romantic? album did not re-capture the group's huge commercial success of the 1980s, with its second single "Soundtrack to a Generation" barely charting.

In 1992, Virgin abruptly cancelled their recording contract. Damaged by the failure of the album, their rejection by Virgin, harsh criticism in the media and facing financial ruin, the emotional well-being of Oakey and Sulley deteriorated badly. Catherall remained positive, and she is cited as the principal reason that the band did not fold at this, their lowest point.

After a couple of years, the band had recovered enough confidence to put out demos to other record labels. Concurrently in 1993, they were invited to work with veteran Japanese electropop band Yellow Magic Orchestra (YMO), which resulted in the EP "YMO Versus The Human League". Released principally in Japan and Asia in April 1993, the EP includes the songs "Behind the Mask" and "Kimi Ni Mune Kyun" ("I Love You"), written by Oakey and Yukihiro Takahashi, featuring the vocals of Sulley and Catherall.

In 1994, EastWest Records (a subsidiary of Time Warner) showed interest in the band's demos and the material rejected by Virgin. They signed the band and paired them with producer Ian Stanley (formerly of Tears for Fears). EastWest financed expensive music videos and heavily promoted their releases. The first release was on Boxing Day 1994 and was the single "Tell Me When", which gave the band their first Top 10 hit since 1986's "Human". It also topped the UK airplay charts for several weeks. The accompanying album, Octopus, returned the band to the UK Top 10 and later achieved a gold disc.

On the album cover artwork and in videos, the group was now presented simply as a trio of Oakey/Catherall/Sulley. In reality, however, other musicians had input to the record, including producer Ian Stanley, with continued playing and songwriting contributions from Neil Sutton and Russell Dennett; and Oakey co-writing one track with Jo Callis.

The next single from the album was the ballad "One Man in My Heart", which features Sulley on lead vocals. It reached No. 13 in the UK and was unique in that it was the only single by the Human League to feature a female only lead vocal until "Never Let Me Go" in 2011.

Their renewed success prompted the band to tour again for the first time since 1987, and they conducted a tour of the US and UK in 1995. Subsequent singles "Filling Up with Heaven" and the non-album single "Stay with Me Tonight" also reached the UK Top 40, and a new remix of "Don't You Want Me" was released to capitalise on the band's revitalised profile. This was in the run up to a new "greatest hits" compilation in 1996, but which proved less successful than their first "Greatest Hits" album from 1988.

A change in management at EastWest in 1998 saw the cancellation of the band's contract once again. Afterward, the band co-headlined with Culture Club and Howard Jones on VH1's 1980s "Big Rewind" nostalgia tour and made other concert and public appearances throughout 1997–2000.

2000s: Secrets and touring

In May 2000, the band signed to Papillon Records, a subsidiary of the Chrysalis Group, and began recording tracks for their new album due out the following year. The next album, titled Secrets, was released August 2001, and, like the previous album Octopus, the band was presented as the Oakey, Sulley and Catherall trio, although Neil Sutton was credited with keyboards and co-wrote most of the material with Oakey. The album received generally favourable reviews from critics. Commercially, the album flopped, entering the UK album chart at No. 44, falling off the chart the following week. This was not helped by the band's record label, Papillon, which developed financial problems. It was closed by the parent company shortly after the album's release, leading to poor promotion and sales. BBC Radio 1 also refused to playlist the single "All I Ever Wanted" because, now in their 40s, the band did not match the radio station's demographic target audience.

Susan Sulley said that the rejection of Secrets was "the lowest the band had been since 1992 and, after putting in so much time and effort in to an album that then failed, nearly causing them to call it a day."

To accompany the then-stalled album, the band conducted the 2001 'Secrets Tour'. Along with Sulley and Catherall, the band had Neil Sutton on keyboards. Long-time studio engineer David Beevers had become part of the on-stage line-up, controlling the sequencers from behind his deck of twin Apple Macs. Oakey further recruited multi-instrumentalist Nic Burke, then aged 21, who he had seen playing in Sheffield, to play electric guitar and keytar. To round off the line-up in 2002, percussionist Errol Rollins was added to play the electronic drum kit. Rollins was replaced by Rob Barton in 2004.

As a point of honour, the band refuses to use playback; they always play live and rehearse before every appearance, ensuring that no two performances are the same. This was clearly demonstrated in 2002, when the band was booked to appear on UK national TV channel GMTV, where they were to play "Don't You Want Me" before being interviewed. The producer was astounded when the band arrived at 5 am (three hours early), expecting to set up and rehearse; it had been assumed they would just mime to playback. Joanne Catherall explained why on air during the interview: "We simply don't sound like we did 20 years ago; it would be wrong if we used tapes, so we do everything live."

In 2003, a second single from Secrets, "Love Me Madly?", was released independently as a private venture by Nukove, a small independent label especially set up to release Human League material, but it did not have funds for promotion and the single did not chart. Also in 2003, Virgin records released The Very Best of The Human League, a DVD of most of their previously recorded music videos. The DVD sold well in the UK and US and was accompanied by a compilation album of the same name.

Throughout the following years, the band has continued to tour frequently, enjoying success and popularity as a live act. In 2004, they released The Human League Live at the Dome, a DVD of a live show filmed at the Brighton Dome, complete with a compilation CD called Live at the Dome.

At the end of 2005, together with EMI, the band released a compilation album of remixes. Called The Human League Original Remixes and Rarities, it was aimed at the DJ/Dance market in the US and UK.

As well as dedicated Human League tours, the band has appeared at many independent concerts and festivals worldwide. They have played at the V Festival in 2004 and 2009, Homelands in 2005, Nokia Trends in Brazil 2005, and Festival Internacional de Benicàssim in 2007.

On 22 September 2006, the band performed on the US network television show Jimmy Kimmel Live!. The band's highlight of 2006 was a performance to an audience of 18,000 at the Hollywood Bowl, Los Angeles, on 24 October 2006, one of their largest concerts to date. This was followed up by an 11-venue tour of Europe in November and December 2006.

The band has been the subject of, and appeared in, various TV documentaries and features, including Channel 4's Made in Sheffield and the BBC's Young Guns: The Bands of the Early 1980s. In June 2007, Sulley and Catherall presented a documentary on Sheffield's pop music history entitled The Nation's Music Cities for VH1.

In November and December 2007, to mark their 30th anniversary (1977–2007), the band conducted their highest profile tour since the Secrets tour of 2001. The 'Dare! 2007' tour encompassed 20 European venues from London to Stockholm, most of which were sold out. Their set list included (for the first time ever) a performance of Dare, played sequentially and in its entirety. This included Philip Oakey playing the Human League's instrumental arrangement of the theme from "Get Carter" on an original Casio VL-Tone from 1981. The remainder of the concert was dedicated to songs from the band's other albums and also included the Oakey/Moroder song "Together in Electric Dreams". The band invested heavily in the stage set and lighting for the tour, including elaborate high definition video backgrounds provided by set designer Rob Sinclair.

A 12" single remix of "Things That Dreams Are Made Of" (originally from the Dare! album) was released in the UK in January 2008, by Hooj Choons. It peaked at No. 2 on the UK Dance chart.

In August and September 2008, the band headlined the US Regeneration Tour, supported by ABC, A Flock of Seagulls, Naked Eyes, and, at some venues, Belinda Carlisle.

In November and December 2008, the Human League got together with Martin Fry's ABC and Heaven 17 for 'The Steel City Tour' of the UK. This was Philip Oakey's concept of a joint tour of all three bands celebrating the original electronic music of early 1980s Sheffield (the titular Steel City). Much had been made in the UK media of the history between Heaven 17 and the Human League, the original events of 1980 and the fact they were now working together. Both Oakey and Martyn Ware said that any acrimony from that period had long since been forgotten.

The Human League were one of the headline acts in the line-up at Spillers Wharf on 30 May 2009, in the Newcastle/Gateshead Evolution festival, and were one of the headline bands for Dubai's first music festival, the 'Dubai Sound City' festival, between 5 and 7 November 2009.

On 11 December 2009, the Human League signed a new recording contract with UK based Wall of Sound. They also have their own studio in Sheffield and are managed by Sidewinder Management Ltd. The band continue to record and play live, with regular appearances at music festivals worldwide, at many of which they are among the headliners.

Although the subject of retirement is often brought up in interviews, Oakey, Sulley and Catherall have all stated that they still enjoy performing and intend to carry on for "as long as they are filling concerts and people want to see them". Sulley has joked that she "has to carry on because she doesn't know how to do anything else".

2010s: Credo and further tours

A new album, Credo, was released in March 2011. It peaked at No. 44 on the UK Albums Chart.

The first single from the album, "Night People" was released on 22 November 2010 but failed to enter the mainstream UK chart. It did, however, reach No. 25 in the UK Indie chart. The follow-up single, "Never Let Me Go", was released in the UK on 1 March 2011; however, in Germany, Switzerland and Austria, "Egomaniac" was chosen as the second single. A double vinyl edition of Credo was released on 25 July 2011, together with the download of "Sky", the third single from the album.

At the end of 2012, the band undertook the 'XXXV Tour' across Europe and the UK to celebrate 35 years in existence. The shows were critically acclaimed. The UK's Daily Telegraph said "as good a night's entertainment as you are likely to find anywhere on the planet".

In March 2014, "Don't You Want Me" re-entered the Top 20 of the UK Singles Chart, thanks to a social media campaign from the fans of Aberdeen F.C., who won the Scottish League Cup the previous weekend. They have adopted the song as a terrace chant, citing their midfielder Peter Pawlett with the lyrics changed to "Peter Pawlett Baby".

In 2016, the band performed their 'A Very British Synthesizer Group' European and UK tour to accompany the release of the multi-disc anthology of the same name. In winter 2018, they undertook an extensive 'Red Tour' in Europe and the UK.

In 2019, a 'deluxe' version of their 2001 Secrets album was released.

2020s: Further releases and Anniversary tour
In 2020, similar 'deluxe' treatment was given to their 1995 Octopus album on its 25th anniversary. Also in 2020, a three disc 'Essential' collection from their Virgin Records years reached No. 13 in the UK Albums Chart. This compilation was unique in that the third disc, with the exception of the first two tracks, focused entirely on the band's pre-Dare material.

In 2021 the band embarked on the 'Dare 40' European and UK tour.  They played the Dare album in full, as well as other songs from their back catalogue.

In 2023, the band announced a US show: they will be one of the headliners at the Cruel World Festival in Pasadena, California on May 20.

Legacy and influence
The Human League has influenced many electropop, other synth-pop, and mainstream performers, including Pet Shop Boys. Moby and Little Boots are longtime fans of the group. They have been sampled and covered by various artists, including Ladytron, Utah Saints, George Michael, Robbie Williams and LCD Soundsystem.

In 2000, the tribute album Reproductions: Songs of The Human League was released. It contains cover versions of 16 of the Human League's songs, including performances by Ladytron, Lali Puna, Momus, Future Bible Heroes, Stephin Merritt and The Aluminum Group.

Nightshift identified the Human League, and fellow late 1970s debutants Gary Numan and Orchestral Manoeuvres in the Dark (OMD), as "the holy trinity of synth-pop". The history of the band's Fast Product era is covered in a 2015 documentary, Big Gold Dream.

Discography

Studio albums
Reproduction (1979)
Travelogue (1980)
Dare (1981)
Hysteria (1984)
Crash (1986)
Romantic? (1990)
Octopus (1995)
Secrets (2001)
Credo (2011)

Band members

Current members
 Philip Oakey – lead vocals, keyboards (1977–present)
 Joanne Catherall – backing and lead vocals (1980–present)
 Susan Ann Sulley – backing and lead vocals (1980–present)

Current session / touring musicians
 David Beevers – studio engineer, synth programming, on-stage engineering (1988–present)
 Rob Barton – electronic percussion (2003–present)
 Ben Smith – keyboards, backing vocals (2017–present)
 Nick Banks – guitar, keyboards (2018–present)

Former members
 Ian Craig Marsh – keyboards (1977–1980)
 Martyn Ware – keyboards (1977–1980)
 Philip Adrian Wright – visuals (1978–1980), keyboards (1980–1986)
 Ian Burden – keyboards, bass (1980–1987)
 Jo Callis – keyboards, guitar, backing and occasional lead vocals (1980–1985)
 Jim Russell – drums, guitar, programming (1982–1987)

Former session / touring musicians
 Neil Sutton – keyboards (1986–2017)
 Russell Dennett – guitar, keyboards (1986–1996)
 Errol Rollins – electronic percussion (2001–2004)
 Nic Burke – guitar, keyboards (2001–2015)
 Josh Cana – guitar, keyboards (2016–2017)

Timeline

Awards
1982 BRIT Award – Best British breakthrough act
 2004 Q Award – Innovation in sound
 2008 ASCAP Award – for 20 million U.S. radio plays of "Don't You Want Me" (in 2007)

Nominations
1982 BRIT Award – Nominated for British Album (Dare) 
1983 Grammy Awards – Nominated for Best New Artist

References

Further reading
 Ross, Alaska. Story of a Band Called "The Human League". Proteus July 1982. 
 Nash, Peter. Human League (Perfect pop). Star 21 October 1982. 
 Lilleker, Martin. Beats Working for a Living: Sheffield Popular Music 1973–1984. Juma March 2005. 
 Reynolds, Simon. Rip It Up and Start Again: Postpunk 1978–1984. Faber and Faber, 2005.

External links

 Official Website
 "Blind Youth" – Fan site: History of the original Human League (pre-1981).
 "Philip Oakey of The Human League: Here Comes The Mirror Man" – Interview with Philip Oakey of the Human League – Rocker magazine, 2011

 
British synth-pop new wave groups
British musical trios
Virgin Records artists
A&M Records artists
Caroline Records artists
East West Records artists
English new wave musical groups
Brit Award winners
Musical groups from Sheffield
Musical groups established in 1977
English synth-pop groups
Second British Invasion artists